Jahnke is a neighborhood in Richmond, Virginia located in the Southside region of the city. The neighborhood lies within the city limits. The zip code for the neighborhood is 23225. Jahnke is named after Jahnke Road (State Route 686) which is the main road through the neighborhood. The heart of Jahnke is at the intersection of Jahnke Road and German School Road.

Education 

Jahnke contains Lucille M. Brown Middle School.

See also 
 Neighborhoods of Richmond, Virginia
 Southside (Richmond, Virginia)

References

External links 
 Jahnke map

Neighborhoods in Richmond, Virginia